The 2014 Nevada Wolf Pack football team represented the University of Nevada, Reno in the 2014 NCAA Division I FBS football season. The Wolf Pack were led by second–year head coach Brian Polian and played their home games at Mackay Stadium. They were members of the West Division of the Mountain West Conference. They finished the season 7–6 and 4–4 in Mountain West play to finish in third place in the West Division. They were invited to the New Orleans Bowl where they lost to Louisiana–Lafayette.

Preseason

Mountain West media days
The Mountain West media days were held on July 22–23, 2014, at the Cosmopolitan in Paradise, Nevada.

Media poll
The preseason poll was released on July 21, 2014. The Wolf Pack were predicted to finish in third place in the MW West Division.

Preseason All–Mountain West Team
The Wolf Pack had one player selected to the preseason All–Mountain West Team; one from the defense.

Defense

Brock Hekking – DL

Schedule

Personnel

Game summaries

Southern Utah

Washington State

at Arizona

at San Jose State

Boise State

Colorado State

at BYU

at Hawaii

San Diego State

at Air Force

Fresno State

at UNLV

vs. Louisiana–Lafayette (New Orleans Bowl)

References

Nevada
Nevada Wolf Pack football seasons
Nevada Wolf Pack football